Kamma may refer to:

Kamma (caste), a caste or social group found largely in Southern India
Kamma, India, village in Punjab, India
The Pali and Ardhamagadhi term for karma
Bava Kamma, a traditional Jewish civil law procedure (1st volume of Nezikin), dealing largely with damages and compensation
The nickname of the Norwegian football club Hamarkameratene
A locality near Cairns in the state of Queensland, Australia.
A mountain range in Pershing County, Nevada, USA
Name of a mountain creek in the province of British Columbia, Canada
Kamma Rahbek, Danish artist, salonist and lady of letters.

Pali words and phrases